is a railway station in the city of Nagareyama, Chiba Prefecture, Japan, operated by the private railway operator Tōbu Railway. The station is numbered "TD-20".

Lines

Station layout
The station consists of two opposed side platforms serving two tracks, with the station structure located above the platforms.

Platforms

Adjacent stations

History
Edogawadai Station was opened on February 16, 1958. The station building was rebuilt in 1985 with a new structure situated above the platforms.

From 17 March 2012, station numbering was introduced on the Tobu Urban Park Line, with Edogawadai Station becoming "TD-20".

Passenger statistics
In fiscal 2018, the station was used by an average of 24,345 passengers daily.

Surrounding area
University of Tokyo Kashiwa Campus

See also
 List of railway stations in Japan

References

External links

  

Railway stations in Japan opened in 1958
Railway stations in Chiba Prefecture
Tobu Noda Line
Stations of Tobu Railway
Nagareyama